Santogold is the debut studio album by musician and singer Santigold (who performed as Santogold at the time of the album's release). It was released on April 29, 2008 in the United States through Downtown Records and on May 12 in the United Kingdom through Lizard King and Atlantic Records. The album was recorded within eight weeks in New York City at Schoolhouse and Pitch Black Studios. It was written and produced primarily by Santigold and former Stiffed bandmate John Hill, alongside contributions from other producers, including Diplo, Switch and Disco D, and vocal appearances from Spank Rock and Trouble Andrew.

This album incorporates a variety of musical styles, such as new wave, punk, electro, reggae and dub, with the aim of defying boundaries and genre classification. This genre-defying approach awarded the album with praise from music critics. It earned multiple spots on music publications' year-end lists of the best albums of the year, as well as on several decade-end lists. The record charted in the United States, United Kingdom, Ireland, Netherlands, France and Belgium, and spawned the singles "Creator", "L.E.S. Artistes", "Lights Out", and "Say Aha".

Recording, music and development
Santogold was written and recorded in the span of eight weeks. When working on the album, Santigold aimed to defy boundaries and genre classifications, and the expectations from a black woman to sing R&B. She says she was "able to work with all these genres that are typically sub-cultural, like dub or punk or something, and then, by writing in a way that had hooks, made it accessible to everyone." Despite the album also being released on Lizard King Records, Santigold had left the label prior to the release of the album, saying that they "didn't allow me any freedoms. The label was a joke and I'll say that on the record. They weren't involved at all and pretty much got in the way." By the time the album was finished, she signed to Atlantic Records, whom she says loved the album and asked her to not change anything on it. The track "My Superman" was inspired by the 1980 song "Red Light" by Siouxsie and the Banshees, and contains an interpolation of it: the song credits of the song were subsequently attributed half to Siouxsie Sioux and Steven Severin on the American Ascap website.

Jon Pareles of the NY Times noted that there was also a "reggae-ska side" in songs like "Say Aha" and "Shove It".

Critical reception

Santogold received acclaim from music critics. At Metacritic, which assigns a normalized rating out of 100 to reviews from mainstream publications, the album received an average score of 77, based on 27 reviews. The album was noted for its eclectic sound and blend of various musical genres, including new wave, electro, indie rock, dub, post-punk, reggae, grime, ska, and hip hop, and was positively compared to various acts, such as M.I.A., Pixies, Blondie, Siouxsie and the Banshees, Grace Jones, Debbie Harry, Goldfrapp, The Go-Go's, Joe Strummer, and the Slits. Will Hermes of Rolling Stone called it "a visionary album" and "one of the year's most unique debuts", and stated that despite being influenced by other acts, Santigold "ultimately sounds like her own damn movement." Writing for NME, Priya Elan felt the album "reveals a glittery crazy-paved path towards a brave new musical future", and commended it for stylistically veering from one track to another while still remaining a cohesive body of work.

AllMusic critic Marisa Brown called Santogold an album "that looks outward at the pan-continental landscape while staying firmly adherent to and respectful of its deeply American roots; this is the emerging—and hopeful—face of the new millennium, and an altogether shining accomplishment." The Village Voice wrote, "With her eponymous debut's deft mix of dap, punk, rock, pop, house, reggae, and hip-hop, she won't completely live down associations with the famous Sri Lankan (whom she also counts as a friend), but the result emerges as much more than a mere imitation."

Accolades
Santogold was ranked among the best albums of 2008 by numerous publications. Billboard named it the second best album of 2008, while Rolling Stone, Spin, and New York all listed the album at number 6 on their year-end lists. Pazz & Jop ranked it at number 7 on their annual list. NME also ranked it at number 7, while Slant Magazine placed it at number 9. Other publications who featured Santogold on their year-end lists include Q, The Guardian, Pitchfork, Consequence of Sound, Paste, PopMatters, Drowned in Sound, Gigwise, Mixmag, musicOMH, Blender, and more.

The album was also included in lists ranking the best albums of the 2000s (decade). Complex ranked it at number 26 on their list, as well as at number 24 on their "100 Best Albums of the Complex Decade" list, which includes albums released from 2002–2012. Slant Magazine placed the album at number 35 on their "Top 250 Albums of the 2000s" list, while Kitsap Sun and Les Inrockuptibles ranked it at number 66 and 76, respectively. In their "50 Greatest Albums of Our Lifetime" list, which includes albums from 2004–2014, Clash ranked Santogold at number 41.

Commercial performance
As of 2012, Santogold had sold 225,000 copies and 932,000 individual downloads in the United States according to Nielsen SoundScan. In 2009 the album was certified silver by the BPI. In 2010 it was awarded a gold certification from the Independent Music Companies Association, which indicates 100,000 sales across Europe.

Track listing

Notes
  signifies an additional producer

Personnel
Credits adapted from the liner notes of Santogold.

Musicians
 Santi White – vocals , guitar , keyboards 
 John Hill – bass, guitar , keyboards , 
 John Morrical – organ , keyboards 
 Chuck Treece – drums
 Chris Feinstein – guitar 
 Joao Salomao – guitar 
 Alex Lipsen – keyboards 
 Alfonzo Hunter – horns 
 K. Louis – horns 
 L. Benjamin – horns 
 Mike Dillon – percussion 
 Spank Rock – additional vocals 
 Trouble Andrew – additional vocals 

Artwork
 Isabelle Lumpkin – artwork, design
 Amanda Chiu – design, layout

Production
 Santi White – production 
 John Hill – production , additional production 
 Switch – production , additional production 
 Diplo – production , additional production 
 Jonnie "Most" Davis – production 
 Disco D – production 
 Freq Nasty – production 
 Jayson Jackson – executive production

Technical
 Santi White – recording , mixing 
 John Hill – recording , mixing , engineering , programming 
 John Morrical – mixing 
 Vaughan Merrick – mixing 
 Dan Carey – mixing 
 Switch – mixing 
 Disco D – programming 
 Dr. Israel – programming 
 Ted Jensen – mastering
 Danielle Clare - 2nd engineer, ProTools operator

Charts

Weekly charts

Year-end charts

Certifications

Release history

References

2008 debut albums
Albums produced by Diplo
Albums produced by Disco D
Albums produced by John Hill (record producer)
Albums produced by Switch (songwriter)
Santigold albums